Dennis Fakudze (born 13 June 1983) is a Swazi international footballer who plays as a defender. As of February 2018, he played for Royal Leopards in the Swazi Premier League and has won 20 caps for his country.

External links

1983 births
Living people
Swazi footballers
Eswatini international footballers
Mbabane Swallows players
Royal Leopards F.C. players
Association football defenders